Buxar district is one of the 38 districts of Bihar, India. Located in the southwestern part of the state, it is a primarily agricultural district. The district headquarters is at the town of Buxar.

Etymology 
According to local traditions, the name Buxar is derived from a lake in the town named Aghsar (effacer of Sin), which in course of time became Baghsar and took the present form that is Buxar. Another Vedic legend states that, a sage or rishi named Besira transformed himself to take the look of a Tiger to frighten Durvasa rishi, and doomed by him to retain the form of Tiger forever. In order to restore his human form, Bedsira  bathed in the holy pond of Aghsar and worshipped Garushankar. To commemorate this event the spot was called Vyaghrasar and later became Baghsar (The Tiger's pond).

History 
The Battle of Buxar and Battle of Chausa were fought in this district.

The present district was created on 17 March 1991, when it was split off from Bhojpur district.

Geography
Buxar district is located in the southwestern part of the state of Bihar, bordered by Rohtas and Kaimur districts to the south, and by Bhojpur district to the east. To the north and west, respectively, the Ganges and Karmanasa Rivers form the boundary with the state of Uttar Pradesh. In Uttar Pradesh, the district of Ballia is to the north and west of Buxar and that of Ghazipur lies to the west.)

Buxar district covers an area of 1,703 km2, roughly 1.8% of the total area of Bihar, making it the 30th largest district in the state by area. Much of the district consists of an alluvial plain, gently sloping downward toward the northeast, with a height ranging from 71m above sea level in the south to 66m in the north. The soil consists of ultisols, ochrepts, orthents, fluvents, and psamments.

The district formerly had large areas of forest cover, but deforestation caused by clearing land for agriculture has significantly reduced its area. This has also caused wildlife in the area to dramatically decline in numbers. Common trees in the forests of Buxar district are mango, mahua, and bamboo. Their main human use is as firewood. Additionally, long jhalas grass grows near the Ganges and is used to make roofs for kuccha houses.

Demographics

According to the 2011 census, Buxar district has a population of 1,706,352 (roughly equal to the nation of The Gambia or the US state of Nebraska). This gives it a ranking of 285th in India (out of a total of 640). With 1.6% of the total population of Bihar, Buxar district is ranked 29th in the state by population. Its population growth rate over the decade 2001-2011 was  21.67%. Buxar has a sex ratio of 922 females for every 1,000 males, and a literacy rate of 70.14%. 9.64% of the population lives in urban areas. Scheduled Castes and Scheduled Tribes make up 14.75% and 1.57% of the population respectively.

Languages

At the time of the 2011 Census of India, 97.57 of the population in the district spoke Bhojpuri and 1.60% Hindi as their first language.

Mythology
It is said that Ahilya, the wife of Gautam Rishi restored her human body from that of stone and got salvation by a mere touch of the feet of Lord Rama. This place is now known as Ahirauli, and is situated six kilometers away from Buxar. The Kanwaldah Pokhara, also known as VyaghraSar, is today a tourist destination. It is in this district that sage Vishwamitra's Hermitage was situated. Chaitra Van, the forest where demoness Tadaka lived and was killed by Shri Ram, is also situated in Buxar.

Politics 
  

|}

Divisions
Buxar district is divided 11 community development blocks, grouped together into 2 subdivisions based at Buxar and Dumraon.
 Buxar subdivision
 Buxar
 Itarhi
 Chausa
 Rajpur
 Dumraon subdivision
 Dumraon
 Nawanagar
 Brahmapur
 Kesath
 Chakki
 Chaugain
 Simri

Of these, the most populous is Buxar and the least populous is Kesath.

There are 1,133 villages and 142 gram panchayats in Buxar district.

The district contains the following towns:

Economy
Buxar district is mainly agricultural. Major crops include rice (especially winter rice), wheat, barley, and pulses, the most important of which is gram. Arhar, khesari, and masur are other pulses grown in Buxar. Other important crops include oil seed and sugar cane.

Industry and commerce are mainly concentrated in the cities of Buxar and Dumraon, which both have soap and furniture manufacturers as well as the main wholesale markets in the district.

Notable people

 Bismillah Khan (Bharat Ratna)
 Gupteshwar Pandey (IPS)
 Ananda Prasad
 Harihar Singh, Former Chief Minister of Bihar and Bhojpuri Poet
 Lallan Prasad Singh (IAS)
 Ravindra Kishore Sinha
Vimlanand Saraswati

See also
 List of villages in Buxar district

References

External links
 Official website

 
Patna division
Districts of Bihar